Madiseh (also Romanized as Madīseh; also known as Qal‘eh Sādāt) is a village in Khorram Rud Rural District, in the Central District of Lenjan County, Isfahan Province, Iran. At the 2006 census, its population was 1,647, in 384 families.

References 

Populated places in Lenjan County